Nervilia, commonly known as shield orchids, is a genus of orchids with about 80 species widely distributed across  most of sub-Saharan Africa, southern Asia (Saudi Arabia, India, China, Japan, Indochina, Indonesia, etc.), Australia, and various islands of the Pacific and Indian Oceans. Six species occur in Australia (2 or 3 of these endemic), with 16 in India, 10 in China and 5 in South Africa.

Description
Orchids in the genus Nervilia are terrestrial, perennial, deciduous, sympodial herbs with an oval to almost spherical tuber and sometimes a few short roots. One or two flowers are borne on an erect, fleshy, leafless flowering stem. When flowering the plants lack leaves, but a single erect or ground-hugging leaf develops after the flower has fully opened. The leaves are usually wrinkled or crumpled with distinct, fan-like veins, giving rise to the genus name. The flowers are often short-lived, lasting for only a few days. The sepals and petals are similar, but the labellum is prominent and often composed of three lobes. The genus is poorly understood, mainly because the flower and leaf are present at different times, so that herbarium specimens are often incomplete.

Taxonomy and naming
The genus Nervilia was first formally described in 1827 by Charles Gaudichaud-Beaupré after an unpublished description by Philibert Commerson. The description was published in his book Voyage autour du monde. The name Nervilia is derived from the Latin word nervus meaning "nerve", referring to the veined leaves.

Nervilia is the sole member of its subtribe, the Nerviliinae.

Species list
The following is a list of species of Nervilia recognised by the Index Kewensis as at 16 August 2018:

Nervilia acuminata (J.J.Sm.) Schltr., 1911
Nervilia adolphi Schltr., 1915
Nervilia affinis Schltr., 1924
Nervilia alishanensis T.C.Shu, S.W.Chung & C.M.Kuo (2012)
Nervilia apiculata Schltr., 1911
Nervilia ballii G.Will., 1980
Nervilia bandana (Blume) Schltr., 1911
Nervilia beumeei J.J.Sm., 1927
Nervilia bicarinata (Blume) Schltr., 1911
Nervilia borneensis (J.J.Sm.) Schltr., 1911
Nervilia brevilobata C.S.Leou, C.L.Yeh & S.W.Gale
Nervilia campestris (J.J.Sm.) Schltr., 1911
Nervilia concolor (Blume) Schltr., 1826
Nervilia crociformis (Zoll. & Moritzi) Seidenf. 1846
Nervilia cumberlegii Seidenf. & Smitinand, 1965
Nervilia dilatata (Blume) Schltr., 1911
Nervilia falcata (King & Pantl.) Schltr., 1911
Nervilia fordii (Hance) Schltr., 1911
Nervilia fuerstenbergiana Schltr., 1911
Nervilia futago S.W.Gale & T.Yukawa 2015
Nervilia gammieana (Hook.f.) Pfitzer, 1888
Nervilia gleadowii A.N.Rao, 1992
Nervilia gracilis Aver., 2011
Nervilia grandiflora Schltr., 1910
Nervilia hirsuta (Blume) Schltr., 1911
Nervilia hispida Blatt. & McCann, 1932
Nervilia holochila (F.Muell.) Schltr., 1866
Nervilia hookeriana (King & Pantl.) Schltr., 1911
Nervilia ignobilis Tuyama, 1940
Nervilia imperatetorum Schltr., 1911
Nervilia infundibulifolia Blatt. & McCann, 1932
Nervilia jacksoniae Rinehart & Fosberg, 1991
Nervilia juliana (Roxb.) Schltr., 1911
Nervilia kasiensis S.W.Gale & Phaways., 2017
Nervilia khaoyaica Suddee, Wattana & S.W.Gale, 2013
Nervilia khasiana (King & Pantl.) Schltr., 1911
Nervilia kotschyi (Rchb.f.) Schltr., 1911
Nervilia lanyuensis S.S.Ying, 1989
Nervilia leguminosarum Jum. & H.Perrier, 1912
Nervilia lilacea Jum. & H.Perrier, 1911
Nervilia linearilabia T.P.Lin, 2014
Nervilia mackinnonii (Duthie) Schltr., 1911
Nervilia macroglossa (Hook.f.) Schltr., 1911
Nervilia macrophylla Schltr., 1911
Nervilia maculata (E.C.Parish & Rchb.f.) Schltr., 1911
Nervilia maliana Schltr., 1911
Nervilia multinervis Cavestro, 2017
Nervilia muratana S.W.Gale & S.K.Wu, 2017
Nervilia nipponica Makino, 1909
Nervilia oxyglossa Fukuy., 1937
Nervilia palawensis Schltr., 1921
Nervilia pallidiflora Schltr., 1911
Nervilia pangteyana Jalal, Kumar & G.S.Rawat, 2012
Nervilia pectinata P.J.Cribb, 1977
Nervilia peltata B.Gray & D.L.Jones, 1994
Nervilia petaloidea Carr, 1933
Nervilia petraea (Afzel. ex Sw.) Summerh., 1945
Nervilia platychila Schltr., 1906
Nervilia plicata (Andrews) Schltr., 1911
Nervilia porphyrophylla Schltr., 1911
Nervilia pudica (Ames) W.Suarez, 2015
Nervilia punctata (Blume) Makino, 1902
Nervilia ratis T.P.Lin & Y.N.Chang, 2013
Nervilia renschiana (Rchb.f.) Schltr., 1911
Nervilia sciaphila Schltr., 1911
Nervilia seranica J.J.Sm., 1928
Nervilia shirensis (Rolfe) Schltr., 1911
Nervilia similis Schltr., 1915
Nervilia stolziana Schltr., 1915
Nervilia subintegra Summerh., 1938
Nervilia tahanshanensis T.P.Lin & W.M.Lin, 2009
Nervilia taitoensis (Hayata) Schltr., 1911
Nervilia taiwaniana S.S.Ying, 1978
Nervilia trichophylla Fukuy., 1940
Nervilia umenoi Fukuy., 1940
Nervilia umphangensis Suddee, Rueangr. & S.W.Gale, 2014
Nervilia uniflora (F.Muell.) Schltr., 1866
Nervilia winckelii J.J.Sm., 1918

References

 Plants of Southern Africa

External links
Nervilia - Commerson ex Gaudichaud-Beaupre

 
Nervilieae genera